Abdusalam Mamatkhanovich Gadisov (born 26 March 1989 in Dagestan) is an Dagestani born-Russian freestyle wrestler. He competed in the freestyle 96 kg event at the 2012 Summer Olympics; after defeating Taimuraz Tigiyev in the qualification round, he was eliminated by Reza Yazdani in the 1/8 finals.

In 2014 he became World freestyle wrestling champion at the 97 kg division, and was the runner-up in 2015.

At the national level, he became Russian national champion in 2012.  In the final he defeated Olympic Champion and five time World Champion Khadzhimurat Gatsalov. He won the Russian National Freestyle Wrestling Championships again in 2015.

He is a devout Sunni Muslim.

References

External links 
 
 

1989 births
Living people
Sportspeople from Makhachkala
Avar people
Russian male sport wrestlers
Olympic wrestlers of Russia
Wrestlers at the 2012 Summer Olympics
European Games bronze medalists for Russia
Wrestlers at the 2015 European Games
European Games medalists in wrestling
World Wrestling Championships medalists
Universiade medalists in wrestling
Universiade gold medalists for Russia
Medalists at the 2013 Summer Universiade
World Wrestling Champions